New York City's 21st City Council district is one of 51 districts in the New York City Council. It has been represented by Democrat Francisco Moya since 2018, succeeding fellow Democrat Julissa Ferreras.

Geography
District 21 is based in the Queens neighborhood of Corona, also covering parts of nearby Elmhurst, East Elmhurst, and Jackson Heights. LaGuardia Airport is located within the district, as is the northern half of Flushing Meadows–Corona Park (including the park's famous Unisphere).

The district overlaps with Queens Community Boards 3, 4, and 7, and is contained entirely within New York's 14th congressional district. It also overlaps with the 13th and 16th districts of the New York State Senate, and with the 34th, 35th, and 39th districts of the New York State Assembly.

Recent election results

2021

In 2019, voters in New York City approved Ballot Question 1, which implemented ranked-choice voting in all local elections. Under the new system, voters have the option to rank up to five candidates for every local office. Voters whose first-choice candidates fare poorly will have their votes redistributed to other candidates in their ranking until one candidate surpasses the 50 percent threshold. If one candidate surpasses 50 percent in first-choice votes, then ranked-choice tabulations will not occur.

2017

2013

References

New York City Council districts